The 1961–62 Tercera División season was the 26th since its establishment.

League tables

Group I

Group II

Group III

Group IV

Group V

Group VI

Group VII

Group VIII

Mallorca

Menorca

Group IX

Group X

Group XI

Group XII

Group XIII

Group XIV

Promotion playoff

Champions

First round

Final Round

Runners-up

First round

Second round

Final Round

Notes

Season records
 Most wins: 25, Langreo.
 Most draws: 11, Sestao and Getxo.
 Most losses: 25, Titánico and Delicias.
 Most goals for: 108, Langreo.
 Most goals against: 128, Santiago.
 Most points: 51, Langreo.
 Fewest wins: 0, Delicias and Alaior.
 Fewest draws: 0, Constància.
 Fewest losses: 1, Numancia.
 Fewest goals for: 9, Alaior.
 Fewest goals against: 12, Constància.
 Fewest points: 1, Alaior.

External links
RSSSF 
Futbolme 

Tercera División seasons
3
Spain